Dolichoderus beccarii is a species of ant in the genus Dolichoderus. Described by Emery in 1887,  the species is endemic to Borneo and Indonesia.

References

Dolichoderus
Hymenoptera of Asia
Insects described in 1887